HexPad is a patented technology that provides a lightweight padding system applied directly to performance fabric. This method of padding is used in many sports but most visible in basketball and American football.

Construction
Hexpad uses high quality closed cell athletic foam padding, the same padding density and impact resistance that is used in pads for American football and other impact sports. Hexpad is lightweight allowing for greater coverage and comfort than traditional padding systems. The spaces between the cells allow moisture movement and breathability for temperature regulation.

Types
There are two types of HexPad available: HexPad Dual Density (DD), and HexPad Mono Cellular (MC). HexPad Dual Density (14mm thick) is designed specifically for higher impact sports. HexPad DD is made up of larger Hex shaped pads than HexPad MC, with two layers, an outer layer of harder durometer and softer inner durometer layer. HexPad Mono Cellular (9mm thick) is the standard in sports protection and is made up of independently positioned hex shaped pads.

Notable users
Dwyane Wade and Shaquille O'Neal of the Miami Heat first adopted the technology in basketball.

Famous players who use this technology for protection against body-to-body contact and body-to-ground contact include Allen Iverson, LeBron James, Carmelo Anthony and Kobe Bryant. In the NFL, a custom HexPad shoulder protector was created for Drew Brees when he returned from surgery.

References

External links
 More information available at mcdavidusa.com
 Facebook page

Protective gear